United States v. American Library Association, 539 U.S. 194 (2003), was a decision in which the United States Supreme Court ruled that the United States Congress has the authority to require public schools and libraries receiving E-Rate discounts to install web filtering software as a condition of receiving federal funding. In a plurality opinion, the Supreme Court ruled that public school and library usage of Internet filtering software does not violate their patrons' First Amendment free speech rights and that the Children's Internet Protection Act is not unconstitutional.

Background
The Children's Internet Protection Act (CIPA) was passed by Congress in 2000. CIPA was Congress's third attempt to regulate obscenity on the Internet, but the first two (the Communications Decency Act of 1996 and the Child Online Protection Act of 1998) were struck down by the Supreme Court as unconstitutional free speech restrictions, largely due to vagueness and overbreadth issues that caused those statutes to fail the strict scrutiny test. 

CIPA required that in order to qualify for federal assistance for Internet access, public schools and libraries must install software that blocked images deemed obscene, and other material which could be dangerous for minor children. CIPA imposed certain types of requirements on any school or library that receives funding under the E-rate program or Library Services and Technology Act (LSTA) grants, which subsidize internet technology and connectivity for schools and libraries. In 2001 the Federal Communications Commission issued rules implementing CIPA.  

The American Library Association challenged this law, claiming that it improperly required them to restrict the First Amendment rights of consenting library patrons. The case originated in the District Court for the Eastern District of Pennsylvania, which ruled that CIPA was unconstitutional because it restricted speech in a public forum (a school or library), and issued an injunction to prevent the statute from being enforced. The U.S. government appealed that decision directly to the Supreme Court, due to a provision in the statute that  permitted appeals to be heard directly by the Supreme Court without the usual intermediate appellate decision. 

The Supreme Court considered whether public libraries' use of Internet filtering software violated patrons' First Amendment rights, as well as whether CIPA was a valid exercise of Congress' spending power by requiring filters for any library who wanted to receive federal funds for Internet access.

Opinion of the Court
In a plurality decision written by Chief Justice Rehnquist, the Supreme Court reversed the District Court's decision, and upheld the constitutionality of the Children's Internet Protection Act. The court held that CIPA only required libraries to install software filters but not to require all patrons to use them, while patrons could also request that the filters be disabled. Thus, filters were not unacceptably restrictive.   

The Supreme Court also held that the public forum principles on which the district court relied were "out of place in the context of this case" and that Internet access in public libraries "is neither a 'traditional' nor a 'designated' public forum" under the established public forum law. A library does not acquire Internet terminals in order to "create a public forum for Web publishers to express themselves, any more than it collects books in order to provide a public forum for the authors of books to speak." The Court explained that the Internet is simply "another method for making information available in a school or library... [and is] no more than a technological extension of the book stack."

Dissenting opinions 
Justice John Paul Stevens dissented, submitting that CIPA unlawfully conditioned receipt of government funding on the restriction of First Amendment rights, because CIPA denied the libraries any discretion in judging the merits of the blocked websites. 

Justice David Souter also dissented, arguing that CIPA was not narrowly tailored to achieve the government's legitimate interest in restricting harmful Internet content. He focused on the language of CIPA which said the library "may" unblock the filters for "bona fide research or other lawful purposes", which imposed eligibility on unblocking and left it up to the librarians discretion. He believed this would prevent adults from accessing lawful and constitutionally protected speech. He suggested that to prevent this, children could be restricted to blocked terminals, leaving unblocked terminals available to adults. He believed CIPA to be an unconstitutional "content-based restriction on communication of material in the library's control that an adult could otherwise lawfully see" rising to the level of censorship.

Impact
The American Civil Liberties Union (ACLU) said that it was "disappointed" that the Supreme Court held that Congress can force public libraries to install blocking software on library Internet terminals, but noted that the ruling minimized the law's impact on adults, who can insist that the software be disabled.  Chris Hansen, a senior staff attorney with the ACLU, also stated that "'Although we are disappointed that the Court upheld a law that is unequivocally a form of censorship, there is a silver lining. The Justices essentially rewrote the law to minimize its effect on adult library patrons."

In 2016, the Wisconsin Court of Appeals ruled in Wisconsin v. David J. Reidinger that a library patron did not have a First Amendment right to view pornography in a public library, and if other patrons complain, such conduct could be considered a disturbance and subjected to a misdemeanor charge.

Further reading

 United States v. American Library Association: A Missed Opportunity for the Supreme Court to Clarify Application of First Amendment Law to Publicly Funded Expressive Institutions by: Robert Corn-Revere
 Internet Censorship: United States v. American Library Association by: Martha McCarthy, Ph.D.
High Court Hears Arguments on Library Internet Filters by: Tony Mauro

External links

References

United States Supreme Court cases
United States Supreme Court cases of the Rehnquist Court
United States Free Speech Clause case law
2003 in United States case law
American Library Association